Zmaj officially named Fabrika aeroplana i hidroaviona Zmaj (English: Airplane and Hydroplane Factory Zmaj) was a Yugoslav aircraft manufacturer.

History

The company was founded in 1927 and it was the third aeronautical factory in Serbia. At the beginning it manufactured aircraft under French license, and in 1932 it started with local planes designed by Jovan Petrović and Dragoljub Šterić. Several types of aircraft were manufactured by Zmaj, among them passenger Spartans for the domestic airliner Aeroput. Zmaj workshops manufactured 359 aircraft up until 1946, when the factory stopped manufacturing for aviation industry purposes and the company was nationalised and merged with Rogožarski into Ikarus.

Aircraft

See also
 Aircraft industry of Serbia

References

Footnotes

Notes

 
Aircraft manufacturers of Yugoslavia
Aircraft manufacturers of Serbia
Serbian brands